Mireille Knoll (28 December 193223 March 2018) was an 85-year-old  French Jewish woman, and Holocaust survivor who was murdered in her Paris apartment on 23 March 2018. The murder has been officially described by French authorities as an antisemitic hate crime, which has since been on the rise in France.

Murder
There are two alleged assailants, Yacine Mihoub and Alex Carrimbacus. One, a 29-year-old neighbor of Knoll, who suffered from Parkinson's disease, and had known her since he was a child, and the other, an unemployed 21-year-old. The two suspects entered the apartment and reportedly stabbed Knoll eleven times, before setting her on fire. The older suspect told investigators that the younger suspect asserted “She’s a Jew. She must have money.” The two suspects have accused each other of the stabbing, one of them claiming that the other shouted Allahu akbar as he stabbed her.

Investigation
The Paris prosecutor’s office characterized the 23 March murder as a hate crime, a murder committed because of the “membership, real or supposed, of the victim of a particular religion.” The New York Times noted, "The speed with which the authorities recognized the hate-crime nature of Ms. Knoll’s murder is being seen as a reaction to the anger of France’s Jews at the official response to that earlier crime, which prosecutors took months to characterize as anti-Semitic."

Arrests and legal proceedings
Two suspects were immediately taken into custody; authorities revealed only that one of the suspects was born in 1989. Suspect Yacine Mihoub, 28 years of age, the son of Knoll's neighbour, was previously known to authorities as he had sexually assaulted the daughter of Knoll's assistant, who was 12 years old at the time. Mihoub served a few months in prison and was released in September 2017. Suspect Alex Carrimbacus, 21 years of age, was acquainted with Mihoub in prison.

On 26 October 2021 trial began in Paris, France for Mihoub and Carrimbacus. On 9 November 2021, Mihoub was convicted of murder and sentenced to life imprisonment. Carrimbacus was acquitted of murder but found guilty of theft with antisemitic motives, for which he was sentenced to 15 years in prison.

Funeral
The funeral procession, held on March 28, drew thousands of mourners who walked solemnly through the streets of Paris.  They walked from the Place de la Nation to Knoll's apartment building in the 11th arrondissement. Knoll was buried at the Cimetière parisien de Bagneux. Her grave was visited by Emmanuel Macron, in a private capacity, to support her family in a visit not covered by the media.

Context

According to The Atlantic, this killing marked a shift in the attitude of the French government. In contrast with the similar, antisemitic murders of Ilan Halimi (2006) and Sarah Halimi (2017), French authorities immediately called this killing an act of anti-Jewish hatred.

See also
 Antisemitism in France
 Murder of Sarah Halimi
 Murder of Suzan Der Kirkour

References

11th arrondissement of Paris
2018 in Paris
2010s murders in Paris
2018 murders in France
Antisemitic murders in 21st-century France
Antisemitism in France
Deaths by person in Paris
Female murder victims
Hate crimes in Europe
Islam and antisemitism
March 2018 crimes in Europe
March 2018 events in France
Murder in Paris
Stabbing attacks in 2018
Stabbing attacks in France
Terrorist incidents in France in 2018